The Canton of Vailly-sur-Sauldre is a former canton situated in the Cher département and in the Centre region of France. It was disbanded following the French canton reorganisation which came into effect in March 2015. It consisted of 11 communes, which joined the canton of Sancerre in 2015. It had 3,409 inhabitants (2012).

Geography
A farming area in the valley of the river Loire, in the northeastern part of the arrondissement of Bourges centred on the town of Vailly-sur-Sauldre. The altitude varies from 175m at Concressault to 374m at Le Noyer, with an average altitude of 274m.

The canton comprised 11 communes:

Assigny
Barlieu
Concressault
Dampierre-en-Crot
Jars
Le Noyer
Subligny
Sury-ès-Bois
Thou
Vailly-sur-Sauldre
Villegenon

Population

See also
 Arrondissements of the Cher department
 Cantons of the Cher department
 Communes of the Cher department

References

Vailly-sur-Sauldre
2015 disestablishments in France
States and territories disestablished in 2015